Louis X (German: Ludwig X, Herzog von Bayern), (Grünwald, 18 September 1495 – 22 April 1545 in Landshut) was Duke of Bavaria (1516–1545), together with his older brother William IV, Duke of Bavaria. His parents were Albert IV and Kunigunde of Austria, a daughter of Emperor Frederick III.

Biography
Though his father had determined the everlasting succession of only the firstborn prince in 1506, Louis as a second-born son refused a spiritual career with the argument that he was born before the edict became valid. With support of his mother and the States-General, Louis forced his elder brother William IV to accept him as co-regent in 1516. Louis then ruled the districts of Landshut and Straubing, in general concord with his brother. In 1516, he refurnished the medieval Trausnitz Castle in Landshut decorating it in the south German Renaissance style.

Like his elder brother, he first showed sympathy for the Protestant Reformation but decided to take action against its expansion in Bavaria already in 1522. Both the dukes also suppressed the uprising of farmers in South Germany in their duchies in 1525. Since Louis claimed the Bohemian crown Bavaria was in opposition to the Habsburgs until 1534 when both dukes reached an agreement with Ferdinand I in Linz.

After his visit in Italy, Louis built the first Italian Renaissance style palace constructed north of the Alps, the Landshut Residence which was modeled 1537–1543 after the Palazzo del Te in Mantua. The Landshut Residence also consisted of an adjoining palace to the previous mentioned which was built in German Renaissance style under the architect Bernhard Zwitzel of Augsburg. Both the palaces were connected together by two wings.

Having no son, the districts that Louis ruled were passed up to his brother William in the end at his death in 1545. This was finally the end of the divisions of the duchy of Bavaria. His illegitimate daughter was Anna von Leonsberg (1525–1556) who married Johann Albrecht Widmannstetter (1506–1557).

Ancestors

External links 

1495 births
1545 deaths
16th-century dukes of Bavaria
House of Wittelsbach